Halford III: Winter Songs is the third studio album by the heavy metal band Halford. It was released on 3 November 2009 in the United States, 9 November 2009 in Europe and 13 November 2009 in Germany. It was written, arranged and recorded between 2008 and 2009. The album is Christmas-themed, consisting of traditional holiday favorites made into heavy metal fashion along with a few original arrangements by Rob Halford and producer/guitarist Roy Z.

The first single, "Get into the Spirit", was released on 29 September 2009. In 2019, Halford released a second Christmas-themed album entitled Celestial, although this was recorded with family and friends rather than his usual bandmates.

Track listing
All songs arranged by Rob Halford, Roy Z, Ed Roth, John Baxter.

Personnel
Halford
 Rob Halford – vocals
 Roy Z – guitar
 Metal Mike Chlasciak – guitar
 Mike Davis – bass
 Bobby Jarzombek – drums

Additional performer
Ed Roth  – keyboards
Production
Produced and engineered by Roy Z
Executive producer – John Baxter
Mixed and engineered by Pete Martinez
Sound design, percussion, and engineering by John Mattox
Drum tuning by Mike Fassano
Mastered by Maor Appelbaum
Graphic direction, web marketing, and design by Attila Juhasz
Cover illustration and packaging design by Marc Sasso
Photography by John Eder, Marc Sasso, David Hildreth, and John Baxter

References

2009 Christmas albums
Halford (band) albums
Albums produced by Roy Z
Christmas albums by English artists
Heavy metal Christmas albums